The Leko–Nimbari or Chamba–Mumuye languages are a subgroup of the old Adamawa languages family (G2, G4, G5, G12), provisionally now a branch of the Savanna languages. They are spoken in northern Cameroon and eastern Nigeria.

The four Leko languages include Chamba Leko of the Chamba people, with about 60,000 speakers.
The dozen Duru languages include Vere, with over 100,000 speakers.
The dozen Mumuye–Yendang languages include Mumuye, with half a million speakers, and Yendang, with perhaps 100,000.
Nimbari, with only a hundred speakers, forms its own branch.

References